Zimmeriana lasiodactylum is a species of cumacean, in the Gynodiastylidae family. It is found in Western Australia at depths of 9-23m. Specimens have been found of adult female and subadult male but not adult male.

References

Cumacea
Crustaceans of Australia
Crustaceans described in 1914